Duenuge Disan Pedris was a Ceylonese, entrepreneur and mine owner. He was a successful graphite mine owner and trader. Making his fortune in mining and expanded into other ventures, D. D. Pedris became one of the wealthiest men in the island at the time. The execution of his only son Captain Henry Pedris by the British colonial government under martial law during the 1915 riots, initiated the movement toward independence and providing motivation and a martyr for those who pioneered the movement.

Born in Galle, he started his business ventures in 1872 by venturing into graphite mining and later open several mines in Galle, Kaluthara and Aluthgama areas. He later expanded into agriculture, real-estate and trading. A Buddhist, D. D. Pedris was a member of the Theosophical Society. In 1882, he married Mallino Fernando Pedris, daughter of Peace Officer Margris Fernando of Karandeniya, they had four daughters and one son. His brother-in-law was N. S. Fernando Wijesekara were leading businessmen of the time. Following the death of his son, Pedris built the Isipathanaramaya Temple in Havelock Town in his memory.

See also
Graphite mining in Sri Lanka
Don Charles Gemoris Attygalle

External links and references

Sri Lankan mining businesspeople
Sri Lankan Buddhists
Sinhalese businesspeople
People from British Ceylon